Zalman Shneour (born Shneur Zalkind; 1887 – 20 February 1959) was a prolific Yiddish and Hebrew poet and writer. He was nominated for the Nobel Prize in Literature.

Biography 
Shneour was born in Shklow (Škłoŭ) in Belarus (then part of the Russian Empire) in 1887. His parents were Isaac Zalkind and Feiga Sussman. At age 13, he left for Odessa, the center of literature and Zionism during this time.  Shneour moved to Warsaw in 1902, and was hired by a successful publishing house.  He then moved to Vilnius in 1904, where he began to publish his first book and a collection of stories. These poems were extremely successful, and many editions were published. In 1907, Shneour moved to Paris to study Natural Sciences, Philosophy, and Literature, at the Sorbonne. He traveled throughout Europe from 1908 to 1913, and even visited North Africa. At the start of World War I, Shneour was in Berlin. During the years of the war, he worked in a hospital and studied at the University of Berlin. Shneour returned to Paris in 1923. He stayed there until 1940, when Hitler's troops invaded France. Shneour then fled to Spain, and from there he went to New York City in 1941. He died in 1959 in New York.

He is remembered among lovers of Yiddish songs for his expression of longing and lust, “Tra-la-la-la,” known as Margaritkelekh, Daisies. Artists such as Chava Alberstein have recorded it.

Shneour had two children: the American neurochemist and biophysicist Elie A. Shneour, and Renée Rebecca, who became the Spanish dancer Laura Toledo.

Translations into English

 Song of the Dnieper, translated by Joseph Leftwich. Roy Publishers: New York, 1945.
 Restless spirit: Selected Writings of Zalman Shneour, translated by Moshe Spiegel. Thomas Yoseloff: New York, 1963.
 A Death: Notes of a Suicide, translated by Daniel Kennedy. Wakefield Press: Cambridge, 2019. .

Awards 
 In 1951, Shneour was awarded the Bialik Prize for Literature.
 In 1955, he was awarded the Israel Prize for literature.

See also 
List of Bialik Prize recipients
List of Israel Prize recipients

References 

Israeli poets
Israel Prize in literature recipients
Hebrew-language poets
Yiddish-language poets
Jews from the Russian Empire
University of Paris alumni
Emigrants from the Russian Empire to France
French emigrants to the United States
American emigrants to Israel
People from Shklow
1887 births
1959 deaths
20th-century poets